Ology is the debut studio album by American R&B singer Gallant. It was released on April 6, 2016, by Mind of a Genius Records and Warner Bros. Records. The album was supported by the singles "Weight in Gold" and "Skipping Stones", featuring Jhené Aiko. Upon its release, Ology received positive reviews from most music critics, who complimented its innovative style and praised Gallant for his singing and songwriting.

Singles 
His official debut single, titled "Weight in Gold" was released on June 26, 2015. The song was produced by Stint. The second single, "Skipping Stones", was released on February 5, 2016.

Critical reception 
Ology received generally positive reviews from music critics. At Metacritic, which assigns a normalized rating out of 100 to reviews from mainstream publications, the album received an average score of 76, based on 5 reviews. Allmusic writer Andy Kellman remarked that is "a debut full-length refreshingly bold enough to contain one guest appearance from a singer instead of several from rappers". The Guardian writer Lenre Bakare noted that "if this is what R&B’s future looks like it’s brighter than ever". In a mixed review Q Magazine's Eric Henderson found the album "not a straightforward journey, then, but still a rewarding one".

Accolades 
Ology was nominated for a Grammy Award for Best Urban Contemporary Album, at the 59th Annual Grammy Awards in 2017.

Track listing

References

2016 debut albums
Gallant (singer) albums
Warner Records albums
Albums produced by Ajay Bhattacharya
Albums produced by Häzel
Albums produced by Adrian Younge